Christopher P. Michel (born August 26, 1967) is an American photographer, entrepreneur and investor. He is the artist-in-residence at the National Academies, founder of Affinity Labs, Military.com and Nautilus Ventures.

Early life and career

Education 
Michel earned his commission from the NROTC program at the University of Illinois at Urbana-Champaign, where he graduated Phi Beta Kappa and was selected as the distinguished naval graduate.  He earned an MBA from Harvard Business School in 1998. He was awarded an honorary doctorate by Tiffin University.

Military 
Prior to his business career, Michel served as a Naval Flight Officer in the United States Navy.  While on active duty, Michel flew as a Navigator, Tactical Coordinator and Mission Commander aboard the P-3C Orion aircraft.  Following his operational tour, he worked in The Pentagon as Aide to the Chief of the Naval Reserve.

Career

Business 
In 1999, he founded Military.com, an online portal for servicemembers, veterans and their families. In 2006, Michel founded Affinity Labs, which runs a portfolio of online professional communities. Both Military.com and Affinity Labs were purchased by Monster Worldwide. In 2008, he founded Nautilus Ventures, a seed-stage venture capital firm.

Michel serves as a Director of Dale Carnegie and CatchLight. He previously served on the boards of 3D Robotics, Kixeye, Castlight Health (NYSE: CSLT), International Data Group (IDG), the United Service Organizations (USO), United States Naval Institute (USNI), Tugboat Yards, the USS Arizona Memorial Fund, the U.S. Navy Memorial Foundation, Alliance Health & EZ Board.  He was also an Entrepreneur-in-Residence at Harvard Business School during the 2010–2011 school year and was named a Henry Crown Fellow of the Aspen Institute. Michel is an advisor to the Union of Concerned Scientists, a Fellow of the Royal Geographic Society, and a member of the Explorers Club.

Writing and photography 
Michel is also a photographer and the inaugural Artist-in-Residence at the National Academies of Sciences, Engineering and Medicine.  His appointment is focused on leveraging visual storytelling to elevate the work of scientists, engineers and medical professionals in society.  Michel has been working with the National Academies since 2009. He has been a member of the President’s Circle and on the advisory board of the Division on Earth and Life Studies (DELS) . He currently serves as an advisor to the Climate Communications Initiative.

He was formerly Photo Editor-at-Large for The Bold Italic and has published a number of fine art books. He is currently working on his latest book with travel writer, Pico Iyer. 

Michel is also a photography instructor at the Santa Fe Photographic Workshops and Esalen. He is also an adventure guide with Natural World Safaris, leading trips in the Polar regions. Chris works closely with Leica Camera.  Additionally, he was an ambassador for the launch of the Leica SL2 camera.

Michel was also longtime columnist in Proceedings magazine. He is also one of three protagonists in Bill Murphy's book, The Intelligent Entrepreneur: How Three Harvard Business School Graduates Learned the 10 Rules of Successful Entrepreneurship, published by Henry Holt in 2010.

Publications 
The Military Advantage: A Comprehensive Guide to Your Military & Veterans Benefits, Simon & Schuster, 2005

References

External links 

 

1967 births
American chief executives
American corporate directors
American non-fiction writers
Living people
Harvard Business School alumni
Henry Crown Fellows
Place of birth missing (living people)
University of Illinois Urbana-Champaign alumni